This list of Roman censors includes all holders through to its subsumption under that of Roman emperor in 22BC.

Censors were elected by the Centuriate Assembly and served as a duo.  Censors were elected to take an account of all citizens and their property value before performing a rite of religious purification.  Roman taxes were levied based on the censors' account, and the censors could punitively tax citizens who failed to present at the census or falsely accounted for their property.

Whilst having no right to uphold law or command in war, the office of censor was the highest honour. Unlike the office of consul, which deteriorated over the Roman Republic period, most censors were men of exceptional standing and character. Censors were known also as castigatores for their duty as the regulators of public morality. For instance, in 92 BC censors Domitius Ahenobarbus and Crassus condemned the teaching of rhetoric in Latin (as opposed to the customary Greek):

Initially, censors were chosen exclusively from among Roman citizens of patrician birth.   after legislation – that he introduced while dictator – providing one censor of each two must be a plebeian.

5th century BC 

Before 443 BC, the consuls were responsible for the census.  In 443 BC, the right to take the census was moved from the consuls to the newly established office of censor.  They were chosen exclusively from Patricians.

4th century BC 

In 393 BC, Marcus Cornelius Maluginensis was elected suffect censor to replace the deceased censor Gaius Iulius Iullus.  In 351 BC, Gaius Marcius Rutilus was elected as the first plebeian censor.  According to the Lex Publilia, since 339 BC at least one of the censors had to be plebeian.  In 312 BC, Appius Claudius Caecus was elected censor without being consul before.

3rd century BC 

In 294 and 265 BC, Gaius Marcius Rutilus Censorinus was elected censor.  This was the only time a person was elected censor twice.  Marcius prevented this situation from repeating itself by originating a law stating that no one could be elected censor twice.

2nd century BC

In 131 BC, for the first time both censors were plebeian.

After only one year in office the in 109 BC elected censor Marcus Livius Drusus died. His colleague Marcus Aemilius Scaurus at first refused to resign but resigned when new censors were elected in 108 BC.

1st century BC

Lucius Marcius Philippus and Marcus Perperna were elected censors in 86 BC. Due to civil war and the consequences of Sulla's dictatorship, no new censors were elected until 70 BC.

After the Republic 

With the solidification of Augustus' rule, the Roman Republic came to an end.  The office of censor nominally continued a small way into the Roman Empire, for example in 14 AD when Caesar Augustus held the office with Tiberius Caesar.

Notes

References 
 General
 Thomas Robert Shannon Broughton, The Magistrates of the Roman Republic, Philological Monograph No. 15, vols. 1 and 2. (New York: American Philological Association, 1951, 1952).

Censors
Censors of the Roman Republic